A by-election was held for the Kedah State Assembly seat of Lunas on 29 November 2000 following the nomination day on 21 November 2000. The seat fell vacant after the incumbent assemblyman, Joe Fernandez, the deputy state chief of the Malaysian Indian Congress (MIC), of the ruling Barisan Nasional coalition, was assassinated in Bukit Mertajam on 4 November 2000. He won a 4,700-vote majority by polling 9,760 votes against three candidates: 5,060 votes for M. Kathiravelo of Democratic Action Party (DAP), Ibrahim Mohamed Rashdi (Independent) 2,158 votes and N. Letchumanan (Independent) 87 votes in the general elections in 1999.

S. Anthonysamy of MIC was chosen to be the Barisan Nasional candidate for the by-election, while the opposition Barisan Alternatif coalition chose Saifuddin Nasution Ismail of Parti Keadilan Nasional (KeADILan) as their candidate. The by-election was a three-corner between two of them and independent N. Letchumanan.

The by-election was won by Saifuddin Nasution Ismail with a majority of 530 votes, polling 10,511 votes. A 77.58 percentage turnout of a total 26,746 registered voters came out to vote.

Results

References 

Politics of Kedah
2000 elections in Malaysia
2000 Lunas by-election
Elections in Kedah